John Alexander Gilchrist (born November 9, 1945) is a Canadian former swimmer.

Swimming career
Gilchrist competed in the 1964 Summer Olympics and 1968 Summer Olympics, with his best performance being in 1968, finishing fourth in the 4x200 metres relay. Despite being of Canadian nationality he won the ASA National British Championships over the 1,650 yards freestyle in 1965 and the 440 yards medley title in 1965.

See also
 List of Commonwealth Games medallists in swimming (men)

References

1945 births
Living people
Canadian male freestyle swimmers
Canadian male medley swimmers
Olympic swimmers of Canada
Pan American Games silver medalists for Canada
Pan American Games bronze medalists for Canada
Sportspeople from British Columbia
Swimmers at the 1963 Pan American Games
Swimmers at the 1964 Summer Olympics
Swimmers at the 1967 Pan American Games
Swimmers at the 1968 Summer Olympics
Commonwealth Games medallists in swimming
Commonwealth Games gold medallists for Canada
Commonwealth Games silver medallists for Canada
Commonwealth Games bronze medallists for Canada
Pan American Games medalists in swimming
Swimmers at the 1962 British Empire and Commonwealth Games
Swimmers at the 1966 British Empire and Commonwealth Games
Medalists at the 1963 Pan American Games
Medalists at the 1967 Pan American Games
20th-century Canadian people
21st-century Canadian people
Medallists at the 1962 British Empire and Commonwealth Games
Medallists at the 1966 British Empire and Commonwealth Games